The Peabody Museum of Natural History at Yale University is among the oldest, largest, and most prolific university natural history museums in the world. It was founded by the philanthropist George Peabody in 1866 at the behest of his nephew Othniel Charles Marsh, the early paleontologist. Most known to the public for its Great Hall of Dinosaurs, which includes a mounted juvenile Brontosaurus and the  mural The Age of Reptiles, it also has permanent exhibits dedicated to human and mammal evolution; wildlife dioramas; Egyptian artifacts; and the birds, minerals and Native Americans of Connecticut.

Description
The Peabody Museum is located at 170 Whitney Avenue in New Haven, Connecticut, United States, and is operated by almost one hundred staff members. While the original building was demolished in 1917, it moved to its current location in 1925, and has since expanded to occupy the Peabody Museum, the attached Kline Geology Laboratory and the Class of 1954 Environmental Sciences Center, parts of three additional buildings, and a field station at the Long Island Sound. The museum also owns Horse Island in the Thimble Islands, which is not opened to the public, but used for experiments. The Class of 1954 Environmental Science Center, completed in 2001 and connected to the museum and the adjacent Kline Geology Laboratory, hosts approximately one-half of the museum's 13 million specimens.

On August 28, 2018, Yale University announced a contribution of $160 million by Edward P. Bass toward the renovation of the Museum. The landmark commitment ranks among the most generous gifts to Yale and is the largest known gift ever made to a natural history museum in the United States.  Bass's contribution will help to fund the renewal and expansion of the acclaimed museum.  The full scope and timeline for the renovation are still under development, but the galleries were planned to be open through June 30, 2020 (the Great Hall of Dinosaurs was open through January 1, 2020), but had to close in March due to COVID-19 and did not reopen before July 1, 2020.  Fundraising for the project is ongoing. Yale announced that admission will be free once construction is complete.

The Peabody has several world-important collections. Perhaps the most notable are the vertebrate paleontology collections, among the largest, most extensive, and most historically important fossil collections in the United States (see Othniel Charles Marsh, R.S. Lull, George Gaylord Simpson, John Ostrom, Elisabeth Vrba, and Jacques Gauthier), and the Hiram Bingham Collection of Incan artifacts from Machu Picchu, named for the famous Yale archaeologist who rediscovered this Peruvian ruin. Also notable are the extensive ornithology collection, one of the largest and most taxonomically inclusive in the world, and the associated William Robertson Coe Ornithology Library, one of the best in the United States. The collection of marine invertebrates is additionally extensive, having benefitted from the work of such prolific invertebrate zoologists as Addison Emery Verrill. The Yale Herbarium is part of the Peabody Museum.

Faculty curators for the collections are drawn from Yale's departments of Ecology and Evolutionary Biology, Geology and Geophysics, and Anthropology. Because these departments maintain a strong tradition of hiring faculty who will perform collections-based research, especially after the renewed support for organismal biology at Yale under President Richard Charles Levin and in particular former provost Alison Richard, nearly all of the collections are under active internal use and enjoy continuous and considerable growth.

Torosaurus 
The museum has erected the first full-scale reproduction of a Torosaurus on Whitney Avenue next to the entrance. The 3 m (9 ft) tall, 7 m (21 ft) long, 3.33 metric ton (7,350 lb) statue was sculpted in clay and cast in bronze, and set on a 4 m (13 ft) tall granite base. The reproduction of T. latus is scientifically faithful of T. latus, and its skin is based on the fossilized skin impressions left by a Chasmosaurus (a closely related ceratopsid).

Exhibits

Permanent exhibits before renovations included:

 The Great Hall of Dinosaurs (this exhibit will be the same place with same mural after renovation) with the skeleton of a Brontosaurus.
 The Age of Reptiles Mural is a  depiction of dinosaurs in their natural habitats. It was painted by Rudolph F. Zallinger, and is located in the Great Hall of Dinosaurs.
 Fossil Fragments: The Riddle of Human Origins is a new exhibit dedicated to human evolution.
 The Birds of Connecticut Hall has 722 specimens, representing more than 300 of the 382 documented species in the state of Connecticut.
 There are  eleven dioramas on the plant and vertebrate ecology of Connecticut. They were designed by James Perry Wilson, F. Lee Jaques, and Ralph C. Morrill.
 The Hall of Mammalian Evolution. Here shows The Age of Mammals mural, also painted by Rudolph F. Zallinger.
 An extensive collection of minerals, primarily from Connecticut.
 Native American artifacts from Connecticut.
 The Hall of Ancient Egyptian Artifacts.

Staff
, the director of the Peabody Museum is David Skelly, a curator of vertebrate zoology and a professor of ecology in the Department of Ecology & Evolutionary Biology and the School of Forestry and Environmental Studies.

The Peabody Museum has curators representing anthropology, botany, entomology, invertebrate zoology, invertebrate paleontology, vertebrate zoology (with individual curators for herpetology, ichthyology, mammalogy, and ornithology), paleobotany, vertebrate paleontology, mineralogy & meteoritics, and historical scientific instruments.

There are almost 100 full- and part-time staff, including curators, assistant curators, curators emeriti, curatorial affiliates, and volunteers. Curators and assistant curators are also faculty members in related departments.

History

Othniel Charles Marsh was an undergraduate and later the Professor of Paleontology at Yale University. His education was paid for by his wealthy uncle George Peabody, who began to donate much of his accumulated wealth to various educational institutions at the end of his life. Marsh and his teams discovered dozens of new genera of dinosaurs and other fossil animals, including Triceratops, Brontosaurus and Hesperornis.  At the request of Marsh, and to house some of his discoveries, Peabody founded Yale's Museum of Natural History in 1866 with a gift of $150,000.

Yale's collection at the time was mostly minerals, collected by the geologist and mineralogist Benjamin Silliman. Marsh was one of the museum's first three curators, and when Peabody died in 1869 he used his inheritance to fund expeditions which greatly increased the museum's collections. His primary interest was dinosaurs, and during the infamous period in paleontological history known as the Bone Wars, he discovered  56 new species of dinosaur and shipped literally tons of fossils back from the American Southwest. His finds also included fossils of vertebrates and invertebrates, trackways of prehistoric animals, and archaeological and ethnological artifacts.

The museum officially opened to the public in 1876. In 1917, it was demolished and replaced by the Harkness Memorial Quadrangle dormitory. Due to World War I, most of the collections were put in storage until December 1925, when the current building was dedicated. The new building had a great, 2-story hall designed specifically to hold Marsh's dinosaurs.

Some other significant events include:

 In 1930, donation of the Harry Payne Bingham Oceanographic Collection, including the work of artist Wilfrid Swancourt Bronson. 
 In 1931, the mounting of Marsh's Brontosaurus was finished, after 6 years of work.
 In 1947, Rudolph F. Zallinger finished painting dinosaurs in their natural habitats in his  mural The Age of Reptiles, after  years of work.
 In 1959, Bingham Laboratory was completed.
 In 1963, Kline Geology Laboratory was completed.
 In 1972, the Birds of Connecticut Hall opened.
1985 - The Museum acquired the specimens of Princeton University following the shutdown of its paleontology program.
 In 2001, the interdisciplinary Class of 1954 Environmental Science Center was constructed on the site of the former Bingham Laboratory. It houses collections space for the museum and laboratory space for several curators.
 In 2005, the Peabody unveiled its 21-foot life-size bronze sculpture of Torosaurus—one of O.C. Marsh's famed dinosaur discoveries.  The 7,350-pound sculpture sits on a 13-foot, 70-ton base of Stony Creek granite.
 In 2018, the Peabody announced a $160 million transformative gift toward a redefining renovation that will greatly expand its research capabilities, education and collection centers, and its exhibition galleries.
 In 2020, the great hall closed in beginning of the year, and the rest of the museum closed in March, and a lot of objects were transport to West Haven campus in December.

Popular culture 
 The museum was featured in The Simpsons episode "Burns, Baby Burns". In the episode Mr. Burns has had a relationship with Lily Bancroft and produced an illegitimate son (voiced by Rodney Dangerfield). He flashes back to 1939 for his 25th graduation class reunion. They make love in the museum, specifically in an exhibit featuring Inuit and penguins.

Footnotes

References

External links

 Peabody Museum of Natural History, Yale University (official website)
 The Age of Reptiles mural

Museums in New Haven, Connecticut
Natural history museums in Connecticut
Yale University buildings
Dinosaur museums in the United States
Egyptological collections in the United States
Pre-Columbian art museums in the United States
University museums in Connecticut
Paleontology in Connecticut
Towers in Connecticut
Museums established in 1866
1866 establishments in Connecticut
Association of Science-Technology Centers member institutions